Bazm castle is a historical castle located in Bavanat County in Fars Province; the longevity of this fortress dates back to the Late centuries of post-Islamic historical periods.

References 

Castles in Iran